Farouk Abd El Baky El Okdah (born August 1946) was the Governor of the Central Bank of Egypt "CBE"  from December 2003 to February 2013.

Academic Qualifications
- B.S. In Commerce Accounting Major from Ain Shams University 1965

- Master of Accounting (with honors) from Cairo University in 1975

- Master of Business Administration (Finance) from The Wharton School, University of Pennsylvania in 1981

- PhD. in Business and Applied Economics from The Wharton School, University of Pennsylvania

Managerial Positions
- Governor of the Central Bank of Egypt (CBE) from December 2003 until February 2013.

- Chairman & Chief Executive Officer of the National Bank of Egypt (NBE) from January 2003 until December 2003 in which he became the Governor of Central Bank of Egypt

- He acquired 19 years of banking experience from 1983 until 2002 working with Irving Trust Company

- New York which was acquired later by Bank of New York; where he has worked as Assistant Vice President for Middle East Division and as Vice President and Africa District Manager

- Dr. El Okdah was the Managing Director of The International Company for Leasing "IncoLease" from 1997 until 2002. He established IncoLease while working for Bank of New York

- In addition Dr. El Okdah worked as an instructor in Accounting and Finance for The Wharton School, University of Pennsylvania from 1978 until 1982

- in 1978, he was nominated by The Wharton School to serve as a consultant for The International Finance Corporation (IFC)- The World Bank

- Dr. El Okdah has been a member of the Board of Directors of Egypt Air Holding Co. since 1998

- He served as an advisor to the Governor of the Central Bank of Egypt (CBE) from 1998 to 2001 in the time of the Governor Ismail Hassan

- Dr. El Okdah used to be a member of the Board of Directors of the Egyptian Banking Federation

- He used to be a member of the Board of Directors and Treasurer of The Arab Bankers Association North America from 1987 until 1989

Previous Positions
December 2003 - Feb 2013: Governor of the Central Bank of Egypt
January 2003 - December 2003: Chairman and CEO, The National Bank of Egypt
1997-2002: Managing Director, International Company for Leasing "Incolease"
1989-2002: Vice President, Regional Manager and Advisor, The Bank of New York
1984-1988: Assistant Vice President - Middle East Division, Vice President and Africa District Manager, Irving Trust Company, New York
1978-1982: Instructor in Accounting and Finance, The Wharton School, University of Pennsylvania

References

External links
Details on the Union of Arab Bankers
Business Week Person Profile
Into The Eye of the Storm, Al Ahram Weekly
Board of Directors of the CBE
CBE rejects Chairman of ANB resignation
Central Bank Governor of the year Middle East

1946 births
20th-century Egyptian economists
Living people
Wharton School of the University of Pennsylvania alumni
Governors of the Central Bank of Egypt
21st-century Egyptian economists